Zlatari is a village in northern Resen Municipality in North Macedonia.

History
Zlatari has two known archaeological sites, one dating from Late Antiquity and the other from the Middle Ages. The latter consisted of a church and necropolis.

In 1873, Zlatari, at the time within the Manastir Sanjak and Vilayet of the Ottoman Empire, was recorded as having 43 households and 135 male Bulgarian inhabitants.

During the Ilinden Uprising of 1903, 55 of the village's homes were burnt down.

Demographics
Zlatari has a population of 118 people, as of the 2002 census. The ethnic makeup of the village has been almost completely Macedonian.

People from Zlatari 
Gjorgi Sokolov (1879 - ?), member of the Macedonian-Adrianopolitan Volunteer Corps
Naum Veslievski (1921 - 1972), partizan

References

Villages in Resen Municipality